Jagadeesh Kanna (born September 22, 1988) is an Indian stage actor, playwright, film director, and lyricist best known for writing and directing Oru Cup Coffee, a short film on mercy killing.
and Never Give Up, a play inspired by the life of Olympic athlete Derek Redmond. Kanna

had his acting debut as the lead in the crowd-funded Tamil film Naalu Peruku Nalladhuna Edhuvum Thappilla
 He is also the founder and CEO of Vaayusastra Aerospace, an educational and research firm combining theatre and aeronautics, with the goal of taking aeronautical knowledge to every village in India. Vaayusastra Aerospace is incubated and funded under IIT Madras's RTBI. Kanna is the author of fortnightly column that combines storytelling with aeronautical science in The Hindu Young World Magazine.

Early life
Jagadeesh Kanna was born in Madurai, Tamil Nadu, to a Saurashtrian father and mother. He grew up in Thanjavur, India, reached Chennai for post graduation education where he attended IIT Madras as PhD Course work student in creative writing - humanities and sciences department and Hindustan University as a master's degree student in aeronautical engineering. He has a bachelor's degree in aeronautics from Nehru Institute of Engineering Technology, Coimbatore. While in college, he worked as an actor for The Little Theatre and served as joint secretary of the cultural committee for Hindustan University. Kanna is a co-founder and CEO of Vaayusastra Aerospace,
an educational firm combining theatre arts, aeronautics and practical sciences, which is officially recognized as "Rural Technology Development Firm" by Indian Institute of Technology Madras and incubated under the Rural Technology Business Incubator, which falls under India's Ministry of Science and Technology.

Career

CEO Vaayusastra Aerospace
As CEO of Vaayusastra Aerospace Kanna created a theatre based aeronautics and aerospace curriculum for children from age five onwards, heads the R&D unit of Vaayusastra which focuses on various aerospace research areas in aerostats, aerodynes, space suits, cube satellites and rocket control systems. Kanna was featured in IIT Madras innovation series for his contribution and research in aeronautics and aerospace education. 
 He writes a fortnightly series in Hindu Young World under the title "Sky High". It is a re-imaginative version of the Ramayana with Hanuman and Megnath as the primary characters and the story narrated from an aeronautical and aerospace science perspective. Kanna was featured in a Tamil hybrid web series titled Theervai Nokki for his works in Vaayusastra Aerospace and featured several times in IIT Madras Incubation Cell articles related to aeronautics and education. Under his leadership Vaayusastra achieved ISRO Space Tutor status.

Now Vaayusastra has achieved the Candidacy status with Council for International American Accreditation, Newyork with support of Dr.Mohanalakshmi, Regional Director AIAASC.

Selected research publications

Actor
Kanna began his stage career in pantomimes for The Little Theatre from 2009 to 2012. He continued performing for several years. The Madras Mag published his short story AnnaParavai.

In 2015, he performed in The Hindu Theatre fest. He was seen in Grand Rehearsals in Chennai to positive reviews.

In addition to stage work, he acted in Tamil feature films Naalu Peruku Nalladhuna Edhuvum Thappilla, 
The film released on 31 March 2017 and had a decent run at the box office but was critically acclaimed by reviewers.
and Thirai kadal (awaiting for release)

Director
In addition to assisting director/cinematographer Rajiv Menon
 Kanna directed a feature film titled "The Stealer"

and short film titled Oru Cup Coffee.

 The film was screened at international short film festivals Cisff and Aisff.

Lyricist
Kanna had his lyricist debut with a music album composed by Bjorn Surrao and released by Anirudh Ravichander.

The music video features Punitha Karthik and Kanna making his debut as a lyricist. Bjorn Surrao has already composed music for the film Naalu Peruku Nalladhuna Edhuvum Thappilla. The song was directed by Vamsidharan Mukundhan.
and "Hey Babe" composed by Bjorn Surrao and released by Think Music

Story writer
Kanna is the author of a fortnightly column that combines storytelling with aeronautical science in The Hindu Young World Magazine and Sun Shine Patrika.

Filmography

References

Living people
Film directors from Tamil Nadu
Male actors from Tamil Nadu
Male actors in Tamil cinema
21st-century Tamil male actors
1988 births
Scientists from Tamil Nadu
Indian aerospace engineers